The Encyclopedia of Malaysia is a multi-volume encyclopedia about Malaysia. To date, 13 volumes of the planned 16-volume series have been published. Each volume deals with a single subject area and is composed of thematic, double-page spreads. Over 400 authors, mainly Malaysians, have contributed to the series. The patron of The Encyclopedia of Malaysia is Tun Mahathir bin Mohamad.

History 
In 1998, first five volumes were launched by Dato' Seri Mohd. Najib bin Tun Haji Abdul Razak who was then the Minister of Education in Malaysia. Volumes 6 and 7 were launched in 2001 by the Sultan of Selangor (at that time the Regent of Selangor). 

Volumes 8 and 9 were launched by Dato' Seri Utama Rais Yatim, Minister of Culture, Arts and Heritage, in 2004. Volume 10 was launched by Dato' Abdullah bin Md Zin, Minister in the Prime Minister's Department for Religious Affairs, in December 2005. 

On 29 August 2006, volume 11 was launched by  Dato' Sri Mohd Najib Tun Abdul Razak, the Deputy Prime Minister of Malaysia at that time.

Published 
 The Environment  (Volume editor: Prof. Dato' Dr Sham Sani)
 Plants  (Volume editor: Dr E. Soepadmo)
 Animals  (Volume editor: Prof. Dr Yong Hoi Sen)
 Early History  (Volume editor: Prof. Dato' Dr Nik Hassan Shuhaimi)
 Architecture  (Volume editor: Chen Voon Fee)
 The Seas  (Volume editors: Prof. Dr Ong Jin Eong and Prof. Dr Gong Wooi Khoon)
 Early Modern History  (Volume editor: Prof. Dr Cheah Boon Kheng)
 Performing Arts  (Volume editor: Prof. Dr Ghulam-Sarwar Yousof)
 Languages and Literature  (Volume editor: Prof. Dato' Dr Asmah Haji Omar)
 Religions and Beliefs  (Volume editors: Prof. Dr M. Kamal Hassan and Dr Ghazali bin Basri)
 Government and Politics  (Volume editor: Prof. Dato' Dr Zakaria Haji Ahmad)
 Peoples and Traditions  (Volume editor: Prof. Dato' Dr Hood Salleh)
 The Economy  (Volume editor: Prof. Dr H. Osman Rani)
 Crafts and the Visual Arts  (Volume editor: Datuk Syed Ahmad Jamal)
 Sports and Recreation  (Volume editor: Tan Sri Dato' Seri (Dr) Ahmad Sarji bin Abdul Hamid)
 The Malay Sultanates  (Volume editors: Datuk Prof. Emeritus Dr Mohd Taib Osman and Prof. Emeritus Dato' Dr Khoo Kay Kim)

References

Malaysia
Malaysian books
Malaysian encyclopedias
1998 non-fiction books
20th-century encyclopedias
21st-century encyclopedias